Christmas Song Book is a 1991 album by Helen Merrill with arrangements by Torrie Zito.

Track listing
"O Christmas Tree" (Alan Merrill / traditional)
"Let It Snow! Let It Snow! Let It Snow!" (Sammy Cahn, Jule Styne)
"Nature Boy" (Eden Ahbez)
"Silent Night" (Franz Gruber, Joseph Mohr)
"Christmas Lullaby" (Alan Merrill, Torrie Zito)
"Winter Wonderland" (Felix Bernard, Dick Smith)
"Snowfall" (Claude Thornhill)
"The Christmas Song" (Mel Tormé, Robert Wells)
"Coventry Carol" (Traditional)
"A Child Is Born" (Thad Jones)
"Away in a Manger" (Traditional)
"White Christmas" (Irving Berlin)
"If I Were a Bell" (Frank Loesser)
"Have Yourself a Merry Little Christmas" (Ralph Blane, Hugh Martin)

References

1991 Christmas albums
Christmas albums by American artists
Jazz Christmas albums
Helen Merrill albums
albums arranged by Torrie Zito